Kamran Sabahi (born 9 April 1978), known professionally as Cameron Cartio,  is an Iranian-born Swedish pop singer.

Being signed to Sony Music, he released his debut album Borderless in 2005. Cameron having been signed earlier to Taraneh Records and Sherfa Music is now signed to Avang Music  and has a publishing deal with Universal Music Group Scandinavia and is working on his new songs. He remains popular in Iran, Sweden, as well as in the Iranian diaspora.

Career 
Cameron Cartio started his music career in Sweden. He speaks and sings in different languages, including Persian, English, and Spanish; the latter was learned in Spain where he lived for some time. Coming from an artistic family certainly helped as well in his musical career. His brother Alec Cartio, is a music producer and music video director.

Cameron Cartio made his debut in Melodifestivalen 2005 with his song "Roma". The lyrics of "Roma" were written in a conlang, a made-up language by Cameron Cartio, "borderless language of love" as he called it. He also made a Spanish language version of the same song. He reached to "Andra chansen" (Second Chance) stage of the competition after qualifying in the Linköping semi-final on 19 February 2005. Singing in the "second chance" qualifying round on 6 March 2005, he failed to reach the finals. But the song proved popular with the Swedish audiences and the single made it to the Top 5 of the Swedish Sverigetopplistan music charts peaking at No. 4 in April 2005.

He followed "Roma" with his first studio album Borderless that included notably, besides "Roma" a duo featuring rai singer Khaled. The song entitled "Henna" is in Arabic and in Persian. Cameron and Khaled also released an Arabic/Spanish version on a maxi CD for Spain in 2006. His song "Henna" (partly in Arabic) and his collaboration with Cheb Khaled made him popular throughout the Arab World. He also found success with the catchy hit "Ni Na Nay". The bilingual English/Spanish "Don't Tell Me Tonight" a song with Edurne made it to the Top 40 on the Greek radio charts. On the album Borderless Cameron worked with the songwriters and producers Alex P and Marcus Englof on the majority of the album.

He was signed with Universal Music Group, Sherfa Music and Taraneh Records. In 2011, he released a dance hit "Electric", a Persian language cover of Melody Club song.

In December 2019, Cameron released his new single "Bespar be Khoda" (Leave it to God). A spiritual pop song dedicated to God. Cameron Cartio – Bespar Be Khoda Song | کامرون کارتیو بسپار به خدا Cameron Cartio is now signed to Avang Music and has released the song "Avalo Akhar".

Collaborations 
Under the name Cameron, he released "You Keep Me Hanging On" produced by Anders Nyman, Cameron Cartio, Robin Rex. The release also included "You Keep Me Hanging On (Remix)" produced by Cameron Cartio himself

He also collaborated with the raï singer Khaled in his hit "Henna" that reached number 9 in Sweden and charted in the Netherlands and Belgium. Khaled and Cameron performed the song Henna at the European Athletics Championship 2006 held in Goteborg, Sweden for an estimated 100.000 live audience. The performance was broadcast by all European National Televisions.

Another collaboration was with the Lebanese-Greek Cypriot Sarbel in "Mi Chica" a simultaneous double hit for Sarbel in Greek featuring Cameron Cartio (in Persian) and a separate hit for Cameron Cartio version all in Persian.

Cartio is featured in an English language hit "Don't Tell Me Tonight" with Spanish pop singer Edurne

Cartio has partnered up with music producer Hamid Shekari who has previously worked with the Canadian artist Massari. Shekari worked with the Swedish artist Mohombi on the remix track for "Mr. Lover Man" Cameron and Hamid Shekari are currently working on new tracks for Cameron's upcoming album. Album release is expected sometime in the fall of 2020.

Personal life 
Cameron Cartio currently lives in California and is married to Delaram Cartio, they have two sons together. He and his brother Alec Cartio owned a Swedish pizza house in Santa Monica, Los Angeles until 2017.

Cartio is involved in charities for third world countries poverty prevention and children's rights. Latest charity involvement was in October 2019 Beverly Hills, CA in association with Global Charity Initiative.

Discography

Albums 
 2006: Borderless

In 2006 Sony BMG released the album with a slightly different track list and including a recording of "Don't Tell Me Tonight" featuring the Spanish singer Edurne. The 2006 release also includes the track "Mi Chica" (not found on the 2005 release), in replacement of "Ni Na Nay" that is absent from the new 2006 rerelease. "Mi Chica" is a common hit also recorded by Sarbel in Greece in a Greek version that features Cameron Cartio's voice.

Singles 

* Appeared in the bubbling under Belgian Ultratip chart but not in the main Ultratop chart.

Songs / Music videos 
 2005: "Roma" (for Melodifestivalen)
 2005: "Roma" (Spanish version)
 2005: "Henna" (with Khaled)
 2006: "Henna (Spanish version with Khaled)
 2006: "Barone"
 2006: "Ni Na Nay"
 2006: "Mi Chica" (with Sarbel)
 2011: "Electric"
 2011: "Bia Nazdiktar"
 2012: "Cuando Volveras" (Spanish version of "Bia Nazdiktar")
 2012: "Sheytoonaki" (feat. Maria Manson)
 2012: "Ye Divone"
 2015: "Delam Asireh"
 2019: "Beresoon"
 2019: "Bespar be Khoda" (meaning Leave it to God)
 2020: "Che Khoobe Injaei"
 2021: "Avalo Akhar"

Official Remixes 

 2011: "Electric" (Ali Payami Remix)
 2012: "Ye divoone" (Ali Payami Remix)
 2018: "Irooniam" (World Cup 2018 Hamid Shekari Remix)

Featured in 
2013: "Don't Tell Me Tonight" (Edurne featuring Cameron Cartio)

References

External links
 Cameron Cartio on Spotify

1978 births
Living people
Singers from Tehran
Swedish pop singers
Iranian pop singers
Swedish male singers
Iranian male singers
Persian-language singers
21st-century male singers
Swedish singer-songwriters
Iranian singer-songwriters
Iranian emigrants to Sweden
21st-century Swedish singers
Iranian expatriates in Spain
Iranian expatriates in Sweden
Swedish male singer-songwriters
Swedish people of Iranian descent
21st-century Iranian male singers
21st-century Swedish male singers
Melodifestivalen contestants of 2005